Damodar River (Pron: /ˈdʌmoˌdaː/) is a river flowing across the Indian states of Jharkhand and West Bengal. The valley is rich in mineral resources and is home to large-scale mining and industrial activity. It was also known as the Sorrow of Bengal because of its ravaging floods in the plains of West Bengal. The construction of several dams on the Damodar and its tributaries has helped control some of the flooding.

Etymology
Damodar  means "rope around the belly", derived from Sanskrit दाम (dama) "rope" and उदर (udara) "belly". Damodar is also another name given to the Hindu god Krishna because his foster-mother, Yashoda, had tied him to a large urn.

Course 
The Damodar is a rain fed river. It originates in Khamarpat Hill on Chotanagpur Plateau in Jharkhand. It travels for a distance of  before joining with the Hugli River.

Tributaries
Damodar River has a number of tributaries and subtributaries, such as Barakar, Konar, Bokaro, Haharo, Jamunia, Ghari, Guaia, Khadia and Bhera. The Damodar and the Barakar trifurcates the Chota Nagpur plateau. The rivers pass through hilly areas with great force, sweeping away whatever lies in their path. Two bridges on the Grand Trunk Road near Barhi in Hazaribagh district were torn down by the Barakar: the great stone bridge in 1913 and the subsequent iron bridge in 1946.

River of Sorrows
The huge volume of water that flows down the Damodar and its tributaries during the monsoons used to be a fury in the upper reaches of the valley. In the lower valley it used to overflow its banks and flood large areas.

Damodar River was earlier known as the "River of Sorrows" as it used to flood many areas of Bardhaman, Hooghly, Howrah and Medinipur districts.

The floods were virtually an annual ritual. In some years the damage was probably more. Many of the great floods of the Damodar are recorded in history — 1770, 1855, 1866, 1873–74, 1875–76, 1884–85, 1891–92, 1897, 1900, 1907, 1913, 1927, 1930, 1935 and 1943. In four of these floods (1770, 1855, 1913 and 1943) most of Bardhaman town was flooded.

However, these ran into dispute and in 1866 and 1873, The Bengal Embankment Act was passed, transferring the powers to build and maintain embankment to the government.

So great was the devastation every year that the floods passed into folklore, as the following Bhadu song testifies:

We have sown the crops in Asar
We will bring Bhadu in Bhadra.
Floods have swollen the Damodar
The sailing boats cannot sail.
O Damodar! We fall at your feet
Reduce the floods a little.
Bhadu will come a year later
Let the boats sail on your surface.

Damodar Valley

The Damodar valley is rich in coal. It is considered as the prime centre of coking coal in the country. The important coalfields in the basin are Jharia, Raniganj, West Bokaro, East Bokaro, Ramgarh, South Karanpura and North Karanpura.

The Damodar Valley is one of the most industrialised parts of India. Three integrated steel plants (Bokaro, Burnpur and Durgapur) of Steel Authority of India Limited (SAIL) and other factories are in the valley.

Damodar Valley Corporation (D.V.C.)

Several dams have been constructed in the valley, for the generation of hydroelectric power. The valley is called “the Ruhr of India”. Damodar Valley Corporation, popularly known as DVC, came into being on July 7, 1948, by an Act of the Constituent Assembly of India (Act No. XIV of 1948) as the first multipurpose river valley project of independent India. It is modeled on the Tennessee Valley Authority of the United States.

The initial focus of the DVC were flood control, irrigation, generation, transmission and distribution of electricity, eco-conservation and afforestation, as well as job creation for the socio-economic well-being of the people residing in and around areas affected by DVC projects. However, over the past few decades, power generation has gained priority. Other objectives of the DVC remain part of its primary responsibility.

The first dam was built across the Barakar River, a tributary of the Damodar river at Tilaiya in 1953. The second one was built across the Konar River, another tributary of the Damodar river at Konar in 1955. Two dams across the rivers Barakar and Damodar were built at Maithon in 1957 and Panchet in 1958. These four major dams are controlled by DVC. Durgapur Barrage was constructed downstream of the four dams in 1955, across the Damodar river at Durgapur, with head regulators for canals on either side for feeding an extensive system of canals and distributaries. In 1978, the government of Bihar (that was before the formation of the state of Jharkhand) constructed the Tenughat Dam across the Damodar river outside the control of DVC. It proposes constructing a dam across the Barakar river at Belpahari in Jharkhand state.

References

Rivers of Jharkhand
Rivers of West Bengal
Rivers of India